Koty may refer to:

Places
Koty, Podlaskie Voivodeship (north-east Poland)
Koty, Silesian Voivodeship (south Poland)
Koty, Warmian-Masurian Voivodeship (north Poland)
Koty, Yavoriv Raion, Lviv Oblast, Ukraine; see List of villages in Lviv Oblast

People
 Abbas Koty (1952-1993) Chadian politician

Other uses
 KOTY (New Mexico), a radio station (88.7 FM) licensed to serve San Mateo, New Mexico, United States
 KOTY (Texas), a defunct radio station (95.7 FM) formerly licensed to serve Mason, Texas, United States

See also
 Koty-Rybno, Gmina Grajewo, Grajewo, Podlaskie, Poland
 Coty (disambiguation)
 Kotys (surname)
 Kotys